Baron Allerton, of Chapel Allerton in the West Riding of the County of Yorkshire, was a title in the Peerage of the United Kingdom. It was created on 17 July 1902 for the businessman and Conservative politician William Jackson. The title became extinct on the death of his grandson, the third Baron, on 1 July 1991.

Barons Allerton (1902)
William Lawies Jackson, 1st Baron Allerton (1840–1917)
George Herbert Jackson, 2nd Baron Allerton (1867–1925)
George William Lawies Jackson, 3rd Baron Allerton (1903–1991)
Edward Lawies Jackson (1928–1982)

Notes

References

Kidd, Charles, Williamson, David (editors). Debrett's Peerage and Baronetage (2003 edition). London: Pan Macmillan, 2003.

Extinct baronies in the Peerage of the United Kingdom
Noble titles created in 1902
Noble titles created for UK MPs